Michelle Chia (born 19 September 1975) is a former Singaporean actress and television host. She was prominently a full-time Mediacorp artiste from 1980 to 2012 but continues to film on an ad-hoc basis.

Career

Acting career 
Chia started her career as a child actress with SBC. She later joined TCS (predecessor of MediaCorp) after finishing her school. In 2000 she switched to SPH MediaWorks but was transferred back to MediaCorp when it absorbed MediaWorks. In May 2012, Chia left the entertainment industry due to the expiry of her contract with MediaCorp. She had declined to renew it, stating that she wanted to temporarily "take a break" from showbiz.

Business owner 
In a 2018 interview with 8 Days, Chia revealed that she made investments into businesses while she was acting full-time, and was a partner of Monsoon Hair Salon and owned an investment firm.

Personal life
Chia was educated at Raffles Girls' Primary School and Bowen Secondary School.

In May 2009, Chia and Shaun Chen was married, after dating for six years. On 28 April 2011, it was revealed that the couple was filing for divorce due to "personality differences". The divorce proceedings were finalised in October 2011.

Filmography

Awards and nominations

References

External links
Michelle Chia Facebook Official Page .
Profile on xin.msn.com

1975 births
Living people
Singaporean television actresses
Singaporean television personalities